Robert  or Bob Miller may refer to:

Business
 Robert Hugh Miller (1826–1911), American publisher
 Robert Warren Miller (born 1933), entrepreneur and developer of duty-free shopping
 Robert Miller (businessman) (born 1943), Canadian businessman who founded Future Electronics
 Robert G. Miller (born 1944), American businessman
 Steve Miller (business) (Robert Steven Miller Jr.), American chief executive
 Ben Lexcen (Robert Miller, 1936–1988), Australian yacht designer
 Robert William Miller (1879–1958), founder of Australian coal mine and shipping company RW Miller

Entertainment
 Robert Miller (pianist) (1930–1981), American pianist and attorney
 Robert Miller (bassist) (born 1951), American bassist and songwriter
 Robert Miller (composer), American music composer
 Robert Ellis Miller (1927–2017), American film director
 Bob Miller and the Millermen, 1950s UK TV bandleader
 Rob Miller (musician). an English musician and swordsmith
 Bob Miller (composer, born 1895), American songwriter, recording artist, and publisher

Law
 Robert H. Miller (judge) (1919–2009), Chief Justice of the Kansas Supreme Court
 Robert A. Miller (judge) (born 1939), Chief Justice of the South Dakota Supreme Court
 Robert Lowell Miller Jr. (born 1950), U.S. federal judge

Politics
 Robert Byron Miller (1825–1902), English-born lawyer and politician in colonial Tasmania
 Robert A. Miller (Oregon politician) (1854–1941), American politician in Oregon
 Robert Thomas Miller (1893–1962), mayor of Austin, Texas
 Robert Hopkins Miller (1927-2017), American diplomat

 Bob Miller (Australian politician) (born 1941), Victorian state MP
 Bob Miller (Nevada governor) (born 1945), governor of Nevada
 Robert Edmond Miller (born 1947), Jamaican diplomat
 Bob Miller (Alaska politician) (born 1953), American journalist, media personality and politician
 R. Burnett Miller (1923–2018), mayor of Sacramento, California
 Robert Miller (Jamaican politician), member of parliament

Religion
 Robert Miller (bishop) (1866–1931), bishop of the Church of Ireland
 Robert Miller (priest) (born 1971), priest of the Church of Ireland
 Robert O. Miller (1935–2009), American bishop of the Episcopal Diocese of Alabama
 Robert J. Miller, American academic associated with the Jesus Seminar

Science
 Robert C. Miller (1920–1998), American meteorologist and USAF officer, pioneered tornado forecasting
 Robert H. Miller (surgeon) (born 1947), American surgeon
 Robert M. Miller (born 1927), equine behaviorist and veterinarian
 Robert Rush Miller (1916–2003), American ichthyologist

Sports

Baseball and cricket
 Bob Miller (pitcher, born 1868) (1868–1931), pitcher in 1890–91
 Bob Miller (second baseman), second baseman from 1923 to 1932
 Bob Miller (pitcher, born 1926) (1926-2020), pitcher for the Philadelphia Phillies from 1949 to 1958
 Bob Miller (pitcher, born 1935), pitcher from 1953 to 1962
 Bob Miller (pitcher, born 1939) (1939–1993), right-handed pitcher from 1957 to 1974
 Robert Miller (cricketer) (1895–1941), English cricketer

Football and rugby
 Bob Miller (American football) (1929–2006), football tackle for the Detroit Lions
 Robert Miller (American football) (born 1953), professional American football player
 Bob L. Miller (footballer) (1923–1993), Australian rules footballer
 Rob Miller (footballer) (born 1980), English footballer
 Rob Miller (rugby union) (born 1989), rugby union player

Other sports
 Bob Miller (basketball) (born 1956), NBA basketball player
 Bob Miller (ice hockey) (1956–2020), NHL hockey player

Other uses
 Robert Talbott Miller (1910–1999), American who allegedly spied for the Soviet Union
 Robert Miller (art dealer) (1939–2011), American gallerist
 Robert Miller (architect) (born 1954), American architect
 Bob Miller (sportscaster) (born 1938), announcer for the Los Angeles Kings hockey team
 Robert James Miller (1983–2008), United States Army Special Forces soldier and Medal of Honor recipient
 Robert I. Miller, United States Air Force general

See also
Bobby Miller (disambiguation)
Bert Miller (disambiguation)
Robert Millar (disambiguation)